José Ángel Gómez Marchante (born 30 May 1980 in San Sebastián de los Reyes, Madrid) is a Spanish former road bicycle racer, who competed professionally between 2004 and 2010 for the , ,  and  squads. His career highlight was his win in the 2006 Tour of the Basque Country, in which he took victory in the time trial on the final stage to clinch the general classification.

In 2004, while riding for the Costa de Almería–Paternina team, he finished eighth in the general classification in the Vuelta a España.

In the 2005 Critérium du Dauphiné Libéré, he finished second behind Alexander Vinokourov on the stage to Mont Ventoux, and finished seventh in the general classification.

Major results

1998
 2nd Road race, National Junior Road Championships
2003
 1st Overall Vuelta a Extremadura
 1st Overall Bizkaiko Bira
1st Stages 3 & 4b
 1st Aiztondo Klasica
 2nd Overall Circuito Montañés
1st Stage 5b
 4th Overall Vuelta a la Comunidad de Madrid
2004
 1st Stage 2 GP CTT Correios de Portugal
 2nd Overall Vuelta a la Rioja
 4th Overall Vuelta a Andalucía
 5th Overall Vuelta a Asturias
 6th Clásica de Almería
 8th Overall Vuelta a España
 10th Overall Clásica Internacional Alcobendas
2005
 2nd Overall Clásica Internacional Alcobendas
 7th Overall Critérium du Dauphiné Libéré
 7th Overall Setmana Catalana de Ciclisme
 7th Trofeo Soller
 9th Overall Paris–Nice
2006
 1st  Overall Tour of the Basque Country
1st Stage 6
 5th Overall Vuelta a España
 10th Klasika Primavera
2007
 1st Subida a Urkiola
2008
 5th Overall Vuelta a Chihuahua
2009
 5th Overall Volta a Catalunya
 9th Overall Tour de Langkawi

Grand Tour general classification results timeline

References

External links
Profile on official Saunier Duval-Prodir website

1980 births
Living people
Spanish male cyclists
Cyclists from the Community of Madrid
People from San Sebastián de los Reyes